Shanghai Yan'an High School is a public boarding high school in Changning District, Shanghai, China. Yan'an High School has been inaugurated Key High School in Shanghai since 1960, as well as Leading Model High School in Shanghai since 2005. 

The school houses grades 10-12 (High School Grade 1–3), and a total of 34 classes.

Every year, Yan'an High School holds highly competitive direct admission tests for outstanding middle school students. For those who were selected through direct admission, a special temporary class of around 30-40 is formed before the academic year. The class is intended to give elite students a head start to high school education, and to offer opportunities to join an even more elite group of students for national and international competitions such as IMO and IPhO. 

The school is most famous for its mathematics (and to a lesser extent, physics) teaching and has produced several IMO gold medallists (International Mathematics Olympiad).

External links
 Shanghai Yan'an High School Website

Changning District
Schools in Shanghai
High schools in Shanghai